Gretel II (KA-3) is an International 12-metre class racing yacht built for the America's Cup challenge series in 1970. She was designed by Alan Payne and built by W.H. Barnett for Australian media tycoon Sir Frank Packer.

Packer had first challenged for the America's Cup in 1962 with the yacht Gretel, which was named after his wife. Gretel was competitive but lost that challenge 4–1.

1970 America's Cup
In 1970 Packer returned to Newport, Rhode Island to challenge again for the 'Auld Mug' with his new 12-metre yacht Gretel II representing the Royal Sydney Yacht Squadron. This yacht was the last of the wooden-hulled America's Cup yachts. Gretel II was skippered by Jim Hardy with Martin Visser as tactician and starting helmsman and Bill Fesq as navigator. The crew included future Olympic Star class gold medallists David Forbes and John Anderson and future America's Cup–winning skipper John Bertrand as port trimmer.

After defeating Baron Marcel Bich’s France in the challenger selection series 4–0, the Australian yacht took on the American defender Intrepid, skippered by Bill Ficker in a best-of-seven race series.

Intrepid won the first race when Gretel IIs David Forbes was swept overboard but managed to hang onto the sail and scramble back on board. Then in a controversial second race, Gretel II crossed the finish line 1 minute 7 seconds ahead, but due to a collision at the start the Australian challenger was disqualified. Intrepid won the third race but Gretel II recorded a win in the fourth race by a margin of 1 minute 2 seconds. Intrepid then took out the fifth race to win the America's Cup 4–1.

Many observers, such as 1977 America's Cup winning skipper Ted Turner, believed that Gretel II was a faster boat than Intrepid but that the tactical cunning of Bill Ficker and Steve Van Dyke and the performance of the American crew were the deciding factors in the Americans' victory.

1977 America's Cup
Gretel II served as a trial horse for Alan Bond’s Southern Cross in the 1974 America's Cup. In the 1977 America's Cup Gretel II, skippered by Gordon Ingate, was one of four yachts vying to challenge for the Cup. Her wooden decking was replaced with aluminium for the new campaign. Ingate had a veteran crew which earned them the nickname 'Dad's Navy'. The yacht was eliminated by their Swedish rival Sverige during the challenger selection trials. The new Alan Bond yacht Australia won the right to challenge but lost to the Americans.

Decades later, after falling into disrepair, Gretel II was restored by a group of yachting enthusiasts in 2009. She is currently berthed at the Royal Yacht Club of Tasmania and steered by Steven Shield.

References

Individual sailing vessels
12-metre class yachts
America's Cup challengers
Sailing yachts of Australia
1970s sailing yachts
Louis Vuitton Cup yachts
1970 America's Cup